Devin Jones (born November 24, 1994) is an American professional stock car and sports car racing driver. He currently races in the Continental Tire SportsCar Challenge, driving the No. 31 Porsche Cayman for Bodymotion Racing.

Racing career
Jones was a successful World Karting Association and International Karting Federation driver, winning pairs of national titles in both sanctioning bodies in 2005 and 2006. He also won seven other local club championships from 2004–2005 at various tracks in Southern California.

Jones raced an INEX Legends car in 2008, winning eight times.  He also finished 2nd in the 2008 Summer Shootout at Charlotte Motor Speedway in the young lions division.

In 2009, Jones moved up into the heavier and more powerful Super Late Models in the Pro All Stars Series. Jones Qualified 8th out of 41 cars in the Easter Bunny 150  in his first career start and finished a best of 3rd in the Independence Day 150 at Hickory Motor Speedway in July 2009.

Jones continued to run in the Pro All Stars Series in 2010 partnering with Jeff Fultz Racing. He finished the year with three top 5s and eight top 10s in 12 starts, along with leading 47 laps. In September 2010 Jones finished 5th in the Labor Day Classic 200 at North Wilkesboro Speedway,  the first race at the track since Jeff Gordon won there in 1996. Jones was ranked as one of the top 30 Late Model drivers in county by the Cale Thompson Report in September 2010. In November 2010, Jones finished 5th in his first ever Skip Barber Racing Series event at Road Atlanta.

In 2011, Jones ran in the Skip Barber Racing Series. In January 2011, he earned a pair of podiums at Homestead-Miami Speedway. Jones raced in the Skip Barber National Series at three different tracks with a best finish coming at Lime Rock Park. In May 2011, Jones tested a USF2000 car for Accelerace Motor Sports. He finished out 2011 racing a Late Model Stock in the NASCAR Whelen All-American Series at Hickory Motor Speedway. He tied for pole in August and come away with three top 5s and six top 10s in eight starts.

Jones ran full-time in the UARA-STARS Late Model tour in 2012 where he achieved his first UARA pole qualifying run at Caraway Speedway and finished the year with 28 laps led, two top 5s and eight top 10s. He was one of the leading rookies in the series, winning rookie of the race at Anderson Motor Speedway in June.  Jones would place sixth in the final season standings.

2013 was a landmark year for Jones as he made his first start in the NASCAR Camping World Truck Series at Martinsville Speedway for the Kroger 250. He also ran part-time in the UARA-STARS late model stock touring series, recording five top 10s in six starts.

It was announced that in 2014 Jones would be going back to road racing and competing in the Mazda MX-5 Cup for CJ Wilson Racing with sponsor VeriStor Systems. Jones would finish the season sixth in points, one of the top rookies, with a best finish of fourth at Road Atlanta during the Petit Le Mans weekend.

Jones would return to the Global MX-5 Cup in 2015 driving a VeriStor Systems sponsored entry. With top-5 finishes at NOLA Motorsports Park and Canadian Tire Motorsports Park. He would also make his debut in the IMSA Continental Tire SportsCar Challenge. Jones would earn a pole position and set a new track record at Canadian Tire Motorsports Park in only his second IMSA start.

During the 2016 season, Jones ran full-time in the IMSA Continental Tire SportsCar Challenge driving a Porsche Cayman for Bodymotion Racing. Jones went on to claim a podium finish at Watkins Glen International, claim rookie of the year and finish the season fifth in the final points standings.

In 2017, Jones joined the No. 07 of SS-Green Light Racing for his NASCAR Xfinity Series debut at Watkins Glen International.

Jones ran a full season in the IMSA Michelin Pilot Challenge in 2018 driving from BimmerWorld Racing in a BMW. He would win 4 races, score 3 poles and win the ST championship in its last season as a class.

Personal life
Jones attends the University of North Carolina at Charlotte. He lives in Mooresville, North Carolina as a professional driving instructor and coach for racing schools. Jones supports the National Multiple Sclerosis Society.

Motorsports career results

NASCAR
(key) (Bold – Pole position awarded by qualifying time. Italics – Pole position earned by points standings or practice time. * – Most laps led.)

Xfinity Series

Camping World Truck Series

 Season still in progress
 Ineligible for series points

References

External links
 
 

Living people
1994 births
People from San Luis Obispo, California
Racing drivers from California
NASCAR drivers
Michelin Pilot Challenge drivers